Gargallo is a municipality in Andorra-Sierra de Arcos comarca, province of Teruel, Aragon, Spain. According to the 2010 census the municipality has a population of 140 inhabitants. Its postal code is 44558.

It is located on a rocky ridge of the northern side of Sierra de San Just, part of the vast Iberian System. Road N-211 crosses the southern end of Gargallo.

See also
Andorra-Sierra de Arcos
List of municipalities in Teruel

References

External links 

 Gargallo, CAI Aragon

Municipalities in the Province of Teruel